Thaworn Senneam is a Thai politician. He was former Deputy Minister of Interior in Abhisit Vejjajiva government from 2008 to 2011 and Deputy Minister of Transport from 2019 to 2021 in Prayut Chan-o-cha government. He has also served as Deputy Secretary-General of the Democrat Party.

Education
Thaworn studied secondary level at Mahavajiravudh Songkhla School, then Faculty of Law, Thammasat University and becoming a barrister-at-law of the Thai Bar Association. He studied Master of Public Administration from the National Institute of Development Administration.

Political career
Thaworn previously worked as a legal advisor to Democrat Party Secretary-General Sanan Kachornprasart. Thaworn was accused in 2006 of encouraging protestors to prevent small opposition candidates from running in Thailand's April general elections. The accusation was part of a larger election fraud case again the Democrats, their opponents the Thai Rak Thais, and several smaller political parties. The Constitutional Court of Thailand acquitted Thaworn and the Democrats of the charges, and ordered the dissolution of the Thai Rak Thai for conspiring to gain power by illegal means.

In 2013–2014 Thai political crisis he joined with People's Democratic Reform Committee to protests Yingluck Shinawatra government within Bangkok. He supervised the security of the assembly and liaising with other coalition groups.

In February 2021, he was found guilty of insurrection during protests that led to the 2014 coup d'état. He received a prison sentence of five years.

See also
 Democrat Party (Thailand)

References

Living people
Thaworn Senniam
1947 births
Thaworn Senniam
Thaworn Senniam
Thaworn Senniam